Scarabaeus puncticollis is a species of beetles belonging to the family Scarabaeidae.

Description

Scarabaeus puncticollis has a distinctive set of points (hence the Latin species name puncticollis) along the basal margin of the pronotum. The head has a characteristic array of six projections, resembling rays. These projections are similar to four more projections on each of the tibiae of the front legs. All these projections are adaptations for digging and for forming balls of dung. The mid- and hind-legs have normal, well-developed 5-segmented tarsi. These beetles feed exclusively on dung.

Distribution
This species is present in Bulgaria, North Macedonia, Portugal, Spain and North Africa.

Bibliography
Motschulsky V. (1849) Coleopteres recus d'un voyage de M.Handschuch dans le midi de l'Espagne, enumeres et suivis de notes, Bulletin de la Société imperiale des Naturalistes de Moscou. Moscou 22(3):52-163 (99-121)
Klug J.C.F (1845) Symbolae physicae, seu icones et descriptiones insectorum quae ex itinere per Africam borealem et Asiam occidentalem Federici Guilelmi Hemprich et Christiani Godofredi Ehremberg medicinae et chirurgiae doctorum studio novae aut illustratae redierunt. Bero, Mittler. Berlin
Castelnau F. (1840) Histoire Naturelle des Insectes Coléoptères. Avec une introduction renfermant L'Anatomie et la Physiologie des Animaux Articulés, par M.Brullé, P.Duménil. Paris 2:1-564
Fischer von Waldheim G. (1823) Entomographia imperii russici; genera insectorum systematice exposita et analysi iconographica instructa, (1823-1824) 2:1-262 (143-152)(189-218)
Latreille P.A. (1819) Des insectes peints ou sculpés sur les monuments de l'Egypte, Mémoires du Muséum nationale d'Histoire Naturelle. Paris 5:249-270
Scarabs: World Scarabaeidae Database. Schoolmeesters P., 2011-05-30

References

Scarabaeinae
Beetles described in 1819